The Council of Clermont (Concilium Arvernense) of 535 was one of the early Frankish synods.
Held at Arvernum, (the later Clermont, conquered by Clovis I in 507), it was attended by fifteen prelates of the kingdom of Austrasia  under the presidency of Honoratus, bishop of Bourges. Among those bishops attending was Saint Gal, the bishop of Clermont.

Seventeen canons were drawn up at the council, of which the first sixteen are contained in the Decretum Gratiani (compiled in the 12th century by Gratian); they have become part of the corpus of  canon law of the Catholic Church, the Corpus Iuris Canonici.

In summary, the canons prohibit bishops from submitting to the deliberations of councils any private or temporal affairs, before having dealt with matters regarding discipline; clerics are forbidden to appeal to seculars in their disputes with bishops; excommunication is pronounced against bishops who solicit the protection of princes in order to obtain the episcopacy, or who cause forged decrees of election to be signed.
The council also declared itself forcefully against the marriages of Christians with Jews, marriages between relatives, and the misconduct of the clergy.

Two further Frankish synods were held in Clermont (Arvernum), one in 549, and the other at an uncertain date towards the end of the 6th century (584/591).

References

Catholic Encyclopedia: "St. Gal"
Brian Brennan, 1985. "'Episcopae': Bishops' Wives Viewed in Sixth-Century Gaul" Church History 54.3 (September 1985), pp 311–323.

Clermont 1
Clermont 1
535
6th century in Francia
Clermont-Ferrand
Christianity in Francia